West Meon is a village and civil parish in Hampshire, England, with a population of 749 people at the 2011 census.

Geography

History
A charter of 932 in which King Æthelstan granted West Meon to the thegn Æthelweard includes a detailed account of the boundary of the estate which almost coincides with the boundary of the modern parish of West Meon. The Manor of West Meon was listed in the Domesday Book as owned by the Bishop of Winchester. A charter of 1205 confirmed the grant of land to the Prior and Convent of St. Swithun, Winchester, in whose hands it remained until the Dissolution of the Monasteries.  In 1541 the manor was granted to the Dean and Chapter of Winchester by Henry VIII, and the maintenance of six theology students at each of the universities of Oxford and Cambridge was ordered.  In 1544 the king changed this regulation, and the manor was granted to Thomas Wriothesley, Earl of Southampton, in whose family the manor remained until 1677.

Other lands in West Meon Parish held by the Wriothesley family were the manors of Hall Park, Coombe and Woodlands. Another manor, called Punsholt, was first mentioned in 1341 when it was held by Walter de Ticheborne.  Later the manor was combined with that of West Tisted and followed the same descent. Punsholt Farm in the North of the Parish indicates the site of the manor.

During the Civil War West Meon was the scene of several skirmishes prior to the Battle of Cheriton, which was fought on 29 March 1644.

The remains of a Roman villa have been uncovered in Lippen Wood, a mile from the village. The outer walls of the villa, some hypocaust pillars and a patterned mosaic floor were found during a 1905 excavation.

Thomas Lord of cricket ground fame retired to the village in 1830. The eponymous pub is in the high street. British spy Guy Burgess lived in the village and his ashes spread in the churchyard.   Between West Meon and East Meon is Westbury House which was built in 1904, after the previous Palladian mansion on the estate was destroyed by fire.

References

External links

 West Meon Parish website

Villages in Hampshire